is a Japanese film director.

Career 
Kumakiri debuted with Kichiku in 1997. His 2001 film, Hole in the Sky, starred Susumu Terajima and Yuriko Kikuchi. His 2004 film, Green Mind, Metal Bats, screened at the International Film Festival Rotterdam in 2006. He directed Sketches of Kaitan City in 2010. In 2012, he returned with Blazing Famiglia, which starred the comedian Yoshimi Tokui. His 2014 film, My Man, won the “Golden George” prize for the best film at the 36th Moscow International Film Festival.

Filmography 
 Kichiku Dai Enkai (1997)
 Hole in the Sky (2001)
 Antena (2004)
 Green Mind, Metal Bats (2006)
 Freesia: Icy Tears (2007)
 Nonko (2008)
 Sketches of Kaitan City (2010)
 Blazing Famiglia (2012)
 The End of Summer (2013)
 My Man (2014)
 Mukoku (2017)
 #Manhole (2023)
 658 km, Yōko's Journey (2023)

References

External links 
 

Japanese film directors
People from Obihiro, Hokkaido
1974 births
Living people